Sergey Aleksandrovich Emelin (born 16 June 1995) is a Russian Greco-Roman wrestler. He is a World and European Champion in 60 kg. At the 2018 European Wrestling Championships in Kaspiysk, Emelin defeated his opponents en route without losing points, but in the final he defeated Murad Mammadov from Azerbaijan in a tight match. At the 2018 World Wrestling Championships he beat all of his opponents, winning overall 44–1.

References

External links
 
 
 

1995 births
Living people
People from Ruzayevka
Russian male sport wrestlers
World Wrestling Championships medalists
European Wrestling Championships medalists
Wrestlers at the 2020 Summer Olympics
Medalists at the 2020 Summer Olympics
Olympic medalists in wrestling
Olympic bronze medalists for the Russian Olympic Committee athletes
European Wrestling Champions
Sportspeople from Mordovia
Olympic wrestlers of Russia
21st-century Russian people